Fess Williams and his Royal Flush Orchestra was the main band of clarinetist Fess Williams from 1926–1930

Brief history 
In 1926 Williams formed the Royal Flush Orchestra.  The popular hot jazz outfit held residency at Harlem's Savoy Ballroom for most of its life and recorded on the Victor, Vocalion, Gennett, Okeh, Brunswick, Champion, and Harmony labels. Williams, Frank Marvin, and Perry Smith supplied vocals.  The flamboyant Williams typically performed wearing a white suit and top hat.

In 1928 Williams traveled to Chicago where he temporarily fronted Dave Peyton's band at the Regal Theatre.  Calling the group Fess Williams and His Joy Boys, he recorded two sides with them for Vocalion.  The Royal Flush Orchestra continued to operate in his absence, and in 1929 he returned to New York to resume his duties.

The Royal Flush Orchestra recorded its last side in 1930.

Orchestra members 
 Ralph Bedell 	        - Drums
 Ollie Blackwell       - Banjo
 Ralph Brown 	        - Alto Saxophone
 Emanuel Casamore 	- Tuba
 Emanuel Clark 	- Trumpet
 Henry Duncan 	        - Piano
 Felix Gregory 	- Clarinet, Alto Saxophone, Tenor Saxophone
 Bobby Holmes 	        - Clarinet, Alto Saxophone
 David "Jelly" James 	- Trombone
 Lockwood Lewis 	- Clarinet, Alto Saxophone
 Frank Marvin 	        - Vocals
 Otto Mikell 	        - Clarinet, Alto Saxophone
 Andy Pendleton 	- Banjo
 Walter "Fats" Pichon 	- Piano
 Kenneth Roane 	- Trumpet
 Perry Smith 	        - Clarinet, Tenor Saxophone, Vocals
 George Temple 	- Trumpet
 Clinton Walker 	- Tuba
 Professor Stanley Williams 	- Alto Saxophone, Clarinet, Vocals, Leader

Selected recordings 
 Hot Town
 Friction listen to recording, via YouTube
 Here 'Tis

External links 
 Fess Williams at Red Hot Jazz Archive

American jazz ensembles from New York City
Gennett Records artists